In law, sua sponte (Latin: "of his, her, its or their own accord") or suo motu ("on its own motion") describes an act of authority taken without formal prompting from another party. The term is usually applied to actions by a judge taken without a prior motion or request from the parties. The form nostra sponte ("of our own accord") is sometimes used by the court itself, when the action is taken by a multi-member court, such as an appellate court, rather than by a single judge. (Third parties describing such actions would still refer to them as being taken by the court as a whole and therefore as 'sua sponte'.) While usually applied to actions of a court, the term may reasonably be applied to actions by government agencies and individuals acting in official capacity.

One situation in which a party might encourage a judge to move sua sponte occurs when that party is preserving a special appearance (usually to challenge jurisdiction), and therefore cannot make motions on its own behalf without making a general appearance. Common reasons for an action taken sua sponte are when the judge determines that the court does not have subject-matter jurisdiction or that the case should be moved to another judge because of a conflict of interest, even if all parties disagree.

Notable cases 
 Carlisle v. United States, 517 U.S. 416 (1996) – The Supreme Court of the United States ruled that a district court could not move sua sponte to grant a judgment of acquittal (notwithstanding the verdict) to remedy the late filing of the equivalent motion.
 Trest v. Cain, 522 U.S. 87 (1997), 94 F.3d 1005 – The United States Court of Appeals for the Fifth Circuit moved sua sponte to reject a habeas corpus claim because of procedural default, citing an obligation to do so. The Supreme Court ruled that this was not obligatory, but declined to rule whether it was permitted.
 Since 2009, the Supreme Court of Pakistan has frequently taken up suo motu cases against government authorities there. This includes cases involving violence in the country, government corruption, imposing price ceilings on various commodities, and many other cases. The extent to which the court should exercise this authority is a matter of political debate.
 A special reference as to the initiation of inquisitorial proceedings was also made by the Supreme Court of India, to facilitate this epistolary proceedings (suo moto cognizance), a public interest litigation cell has been opened in the Supreme Court to which letters addressed to the Court or individual judges are forwarded which are placed before the Chief Justice after scrutiny by the staff attached to the cell. The court is not bound by the Civil Procedure Code and the Evidence Act to fulfill the object and purpose of Article 32, and can devise inquisitorial or other procedures.

Other uses
 The 75th Ranger Regiment (United States Army Rangers) uses Sua Sponte as their regimental motto, referring to the Rangers' ability to accomplish tasks with little to no prompting and to recognize that a Ranger volunteers three times: for the U.S. Army, Airborne School, and service in the 75th Ranger Regiment.

See also
 Motu proprio

References

Latin legal terminology